Manuel Rosas may refer to:

 Manuel Rosas (footballer, born 1912) (1912–1989), Mexican football defender
 Manuel Rosas (footballer, born 1983), Nicaraguan football left-back

See also
 Manuela Rosas (1817-1898), Argentine personality and activist
 Manuel La Rosa (born 1992), Italian football midfielder